is a Japanese footballer currently playing as a defender for Kyoto Sanga FC.

International career
Born in Japan, Appiah Tawiah is of Ghanaian descent. He is a youth international for Japan.

Career statistics

Club
.

Notes

References

External links

1998 births
Living people
Association football people from Aichi Prefecture
Japanese footballers
Japan youth international footballers
Japanese people of Ghanaian descent
Sportspeople of Ghanaian descent
Ryutsu Keizai University alumni
Association football defenders
Japan Football League players
J1 League players
Vegalta Sendai players
Kyoto Sanga FC players